The 1933 Connecticut State Aggies football team represented Connecticut State College, now the University of Connecticut, in the 1933 college football season.  The Aggies were led by eleventh year head coach Sumner Dole, and completed the season with a record of 1–6–1.

Schedule

References

Connecticut State
UConn Huskies football seasons
Connecticut State Aggies football